Pet Pals in Windland is a 2014 Italian-language 3D computer-animated children's film directed by Sergio Manfio from a screenplay by Sergio, Francesco Manfio, Anna Manfio and Davide Stefanato. Based on the Pet Pals animated television series, it is the second feature-length film based on the series after Pet Pals: Marco Polo's Code (2010). Pet Pals in Windland was produced by Gruppo Alcuni, and co-produced by the Luxembourgish LuxAnimation. It was released in Italian cinemas on 27 March 2014.

Voice cast

English dubbing 
The following is the voice cast of the English dubbed version:
Eileen McNamara as Crow Witch
Angela Mulligan as Holly
Anthony Salerno as Moby
Christopher R. Burns as Pio
Melissa Hope as Diva
Bill Timoney as King Cyclone and Tail
Michael Colasurdo as Top Hat
Joe Rodriguez as Wind Keeper
Bill Rogers as Cuncun
Richard M. Davidson as Ambrosio
Ken Spassione Jr. as Canbaluc
Gary Martin as Kite

Release 
Pet Pals in Windland was released in Italian cinemas on 27 March 2014 by 01 Distribution. It had an opening weekend gross of $198,543, finishing with a worldwide box office gross of $356,152. It received positive reception for its ecological messages, such as the importance of renewable energy sources.

References

External links 

2014 films
2014 animated films
2014 3D films
Italian children's films